Vasile Bârcă (born 2 January 1884, Ignăţei, Orhei county - died 14 May 1949, Bucharest) was a Moldovan politician, member of the Moldovan Parliament, mayor of Chișinău and minister during Greater Romania.

Biography
He studied law at the University of Petersburg (1906), obtaining his doctorate in law. He worked as a lawyer. He was elected in the Moldovan Parliament by the Soroca County Congress (5 March 1918). He presided over the memorable congress, at which was preliminarily voted for the reunited motion of the Soroca county in Romania. Mandate validated on 18 March 1918 to 18 February 1919. As a deputy in the Moldovan Parliament, he advocated for the positive resolution of all the issues raised concerning the holy cause of Bessarabia – the union with Motherland..

Sfatul Țării, Greater Romania
In the Moldovan Parliament he held the post of vice-president (25 November 1918 – 18 February 1919), Deputy Chairman of the Constitutional Commission (19 May – 27 November 1918), Member of the Legal Commission.

After Greater Union devoted himself to political and administrative activities, joining the National Liberal Party. Director General of the Domestic Department, Domestic Affairs and Directorate of Justice in the years 1920 – 1921, mayor of Chișinău in 1922 – 1923 and second time in the years 1924 – 1925, Chairman of the Unification Commission, Undersecretary of State at the Ministry of the Interior in 1936 – 1937, director of Basarabia daily and deputy Orhei in 10 legislatures.

Vasile Bârcă died on 14 May 1949 in Bucharest and was buried in the Bellu Cemetery.

External links 
 Personalităţi marcante ale neamului - Vasile Bârcă

Notes

1884 births
1949 deaths
People from Rezina District
People from Bessarabia Governorate
Romanian people of Moldovan descent
National Moldavian Party politicians
National Liberal Party (Romania, 1875) politicians
Deputy Presidents of the Moldovan Parliament
Moldovan MPs 1917–1918
Mayors of Chișinău
Saint Petersburg State University alumni
Burials at Bellu Cemetery